The 1854 Pennsylvania gubernatorial election occurred on October 10, 1854. Incumbent governor William Bigler, a Democrat, was a candidate for re-election but was defeated by Whig candidate James Pollock. Bigler became the last sitting Governor of Pennsylvania to be defeated for reelection until Tom Corbett in 2014. This was the last time that a candidate not from the Democratic or Republican parties was elected Governor of Pennsylvania.

Results

References

1854
Pennsylvania
Gubernatorial
November 1854 events